Ian Gouveia (born October 27, 1992) is a Brazilian professional surfer who competes on the World Surfing League Men's World Tour since 2017.

Career

Victories

WSL World Championship Tour

References

External links

Brazilian surfers
1989 births
Living people
Sportspeople from São Paulo
World Surf League surfers